Elaeocarpus brigittae is a species of flowering plant in the Elaeocarpaceae family. It is found only in Sumatra.

See also
 List of Elaeocarpus species

References

brigittae
Endemic flora of Sumatra
Vulnerable plants
Taxonomy articles created by Polbot